Hüti may refer to several places in Estonia:

Hüti, Hiiu County, village in Hiiu Parish, Hiiu County
Hüti, Võru County, village in Mõniste Parish, Võru County

See also
Huti (disambiguation)